James Ward Keesey (October 27, 1902 – September 5, 1951) was an American professional baseball player. He played in 5 games for the Major League Baseball Philadelphia Athletics during the  season and 11 games during the  season. He was born in Perryville, Maryland, and died in Boise, Idaho, at the age of 48.

External links

Major League Baseball first basemen
Philadelphia Athletics players
Frederick Hustlers players
Boise Pilots players
Chicago Cubs scouts
Cincinnati Reds scouts
Baseball players from Baltimore
1902 births
1951 deaths
People from Cecil County, Maryland
Alijadores de Tampico players
American expatriate baseball players in Mexico
Dallas Steers players
Hartford Senators players
Jersey City Skeeters players
Kansas City Blues (baseball) players
Oklahoma City Indians players
Portland Beavers players
Portsmouth Cubs players
Portsmouth Truckers players
Reading Keystones players
San Francisco Seals (baseball) players
Seattle Rainiers players